The following outline is provided as an overview of and topical guide to Barcelona:

Barcelona –

General reference 
 Pronunciation:;
 Common English name(s): Barcelona
 Official English name(s): Barcelona
 Adjectival(s): Barcelonian
 Demonym(s): Barcelonian

Geography of Barcelona 

Geography of Barcelona
 Barcelona is:
 a city
 capital of Catalonia
 Population of Barcelona: 1,620,809 
 Area of Barcelona: 101.4 km2 (39.2 sq mi)

Location of Barcelona 

 Barcelona is situated within the following regions:
 Northern Hemisphere and Western Hemisphere
 Europe (outline) 
 Southern Europe
 Iberian Peninsula
 Spain (outline)
 Catalonia (outline)
 Province of Barcelona
 Barcelona metropolitan area
 Time zone(s): 
 Central European Time (UTC+01)
 In Summer: Central European Summer Time (UTC+02)

Environment of Barcelona 

 Climate of Barcelona

Natural geographic features of Barcelona 

 Beaches in Barcelona
 La Barceloneta
 Sant Sebastià
 Somorrostro
 Hills in barcelona
 Montjuïc
 Mountains in Barcelona
 Tibidabo

Areas of Barcelona 

 Zona Franca

Districts of Barcelona 

Districts of Barcelona
 Ciutat Vella
 Eixample
 Sants-Montjuïc
 Les Corts
 Sarrià-Sant Gervasi
 Gràcia
 Horta-Guinardó
 Nou Barris
 Sant Andreu
 Sant Martí

Neighbourhoods in Barcelona 

 La Barceloneta
 Gothic Quarte

Locations in Barcelona 

 Tourist attractions in Barcelona
 Museums in Barcelona
 Shopping areas and markets
Markets in Barcelona
 World Heritage Sites in Barcelona
Casa Batlló
Casa Milà
Casa Vicens
Church of Colònia Güell
Hospital de Sant Pau
Palau de la Música Catalana
Palau Güell
Park Güell
Sagrada Família

Ancient monuments in Barcelona 

 Barcelona Roman amphitheatre and circus
 Temple of Augustus

Bridges in Barcelona 

 Bac de Roda Bridge
 Porta d’Europa

Cultural and exhibition centres in Barcelona 

 Centre de Cultura Contemporània de Barcelona

Forts in Barcelona 

 Montjuïc Castle

Fountains in Barcelona 

Fountains of Barcelona
 Font de Canaletes
 Magic Fountain of Montjuïc

Monuments and memorials in Barcelona 

 Columbus Monument
 Fossar de les Moreres
 The Four Columns

Museums and art galleries in Barcelona 

Museums in Barcelona
 Barcelona City History Museum
 Barcelona Museum of Contemporary Art
 Can Framis Museum
 Centre d'Art Santa Mònica
 Design Museum of Barcelona
 FC Barcelona Museum
 Fundació Antoni Tàpies
 Fundació Joan Miró
 Gaudi House Museum
 Maritime Museum of Barcelona
 Museu de la Xocolata
 Museu de la Música de Barcelona
 Museu de les Arts Decoratives
 Museu Nacional d'Art de Catalunya
 Museu Picasso
 Perfume Museum
 Poble Espanyol
 Sala Parés

Palaces and villas in Barcelona 

 Bellesguard
 Palau de la Generalitat de Catalunya
 Palau del Parlament de Catalunya
 Palau Güell
 Palau Nacional
 Palau Reial de Pedralbes
 Palau Reial Major
 Palau Robert
 Virreina Palace

Parks and gardens in Barcelona 

 Catalunya en Miniatura
 Jardí Botànic de Barcelona
 Mossèn Costa i Llobera Gardens
 Oreneta Park
 Parc de la Ciutadella
 Parc de la Creueta del Coll
 Parc del Laberint d'Horta
 Park Güell

Public squares in Barcelona 

 Plaça d'Espanya
 Plaça d'Europa
 Plaça d'Ildefons Cerdà
 Plaça de Catalunya
 Plaça de Francesc Macià
 Plaça de Mossèn Jacint Verdaguer
 Plaça de Sant Felip Neri
 Plaça de la Universitat
 Plaça de les Glòries Catalanes
 Plaça del Rei
 Plaça Sant Jaume
 Plaça Urquinaona

Religious buildings in Barcelona 

 Barcelona Cathedral
 Church of Colònia Güell
 Church of Saint Philip Neri
 Monastery of Pedralbes
 Sagrada Família
 Sant Pau del Camp
 Santa Maria del Mar
 Santa Maria del Pi
 Temple Expiatori del Sagrat Cor

Secular buildings in Barcelona 

 Aquarium Barcelona
 Barcelona Pavilion
 Barcelona Royal Shipyard
 Casa Amatller
 Casa Batlló
 Casa Bloc
 Casa Bonaventura Ferrer
 Casa Calvet
 Casa de les Punxes
 Casa Lleó Morera
 Casa Martí
 Casa Milà
 Casa Padellàs
 Casa Serra
 Casa Trinxet
 Casa Vicens
 Cases Marfà
 Castle of the Three Dragons
 Ciutat de la Justícia de Barcelona i l'Hospitalet de Llobregat
 Diagonal Zero Zero
 Edifici de Sindicats
 Edifici Gas Natural
 Edificio Colón
 Fabra Observatory
 Forum Building
 Güell Pavilions
 Hospital de Sant Pau
 Illa de la Discòrdia
 La Monumental
 Old Hospital de la Santa Creu
 Torre Glòries
 Torre Mapfre
 Walden 7
 World Trade Center Barcelona

Streets in Barcelona 

 Avinguda de Josep Tarradellas, Barcelona
 Avinguda del Paral·lel
 Avinguda Diagonal
 Avinguda Meridiana
 Gran Via de les Corts Catalanes
 Passeig de Gràcia
 Portal de l'Àngel
 La Rambla
 Rambla de Catalunya
 Travessera de Dalt
 Via Laietana

Theatres in Barcelona 

 Coliseum (Barcelona)
 Teatre Grec
 Teatre Lliure
 Teatre Nacional de Catalunya
 Teatre Principal

Triumphal arches in Barcelona 

 Arc de Triomf

Towers in Barcelona 

 Montjuïc Communications Tower
 Torre de Collserola
 Torre Jaume I
 Torre Sant Sebastià
 Venetian Towers

Demographics of Barcelona 

Demographics of Barcelona

Government and politics of Barcelona 

Politics of Barcelona
 Generalitat de Catalunya
 Executive Council of Catalonia
 Parliament of Catalonia
 President of the Government of Catalonia
List of presidents of the Government of Catalonia
 High Court of Justice of Catalonia
 Mayors of  Barcelona
 Municipal elections in Barcelona
 
 International relations of Barcelona
 Twin towns and sister cities of Barcelona

Law and order in Barcelona 

 Law enforcement in Barcelona
 Guàrdia Urbana de Barcelona
 Mossos d'Esquadra

History of Barcelona 

History of Barcelona

History of Barcelona, by period or event 

Timeline of Barcelona
 Prehistory and origin of Barcelona 
 Roman Barcelona
 Barcelona is settled by the Romans under the name of Barcino (ca. 15 BC)
 Medieval Barcelona
 The city is conquered by the Visigoths and becomes for a few years the capital of Hispania (5th century)
 After being conquered by the Arabs in the early 8th century, Barcelona is conquered by Charlemagne's son Louis and incorporated into the Frankish kingdom (801)
Barcelona in the Spanish March
Barcelona under the Crown of Aragon
 Barcelona under the Spanish monarchy
 Much of Barcelona is negatively affected by the Napoleonic wars. The city is annexed by Napoleonic France and incorporated into the First French Empire (1812)
 The Spanish Civil War and the Franco period (1936–1975)
 Barcelona becomes capital of the Republic of Spain from November 1937 until January 1939
 The city falls into Nationalist hands on 26 January 1939
 Modern Barcelona (1975–present)

History of Barcelona, by subject 

 Battle of Barcelona
 Bombing of Barcelona
 Siege of Barcelona (1651)

Culture of Barcelona 

Culture of Barcelona

Arts in Barcelona

Architecture of Barcelona 
Architecture of Barcelona
 Buildings in Barcelona
 Modernista buildings in Barcelona
 Tallest buildings in Barcelona

Cinema of Barcelona 
 Barcelona School of Film
 Filmoteca de Catalunya

Music of Barcelona 

Music of Barcelona
 Music festivals and competitions in Barcelona
 Barcelona Beach Festival
 Festival de Guitarra de Barcelona
 Primavera Sound
 Sónar
 Music schools in Barcelona
 Catalonia College of Music
 Conservatori Superior de Música del Liceu
 Municipal Conservatory of Barcelona
 Music venues in Barcelona
 L'Auditori
 Liceu
 Palau de la Música Catalana
 Musical ensembles in Barcelona
 Barcelona Guitar Orchestra
 Barcelona Symphony and Catalonia National Orchestra
 Orquestra Simfònica del Gran Teatre del Liceu
 Musicians from Barcelona
 Leonardo Balada
 Carlos Surinach
 Songs about Barcelona
 Barcelona

Theatre of Barcelona 
Theatre in Barcelona

Visual arts of Barcelona 
 

Art in Barcelona
 Public art in Barcelona
 Dona i Ocell
 El Cap de Barcelona
 The Caress of a Bird
 Topos V
Cuisine of Barcelona
 Mató de Pedralbes
Events in Barcelona
 1888 Barcelona Universal Exposition
 1929 Barcelona International Exposition
 2004 Universal Forum of Cultures
 Catalonia April Fair
 Fira de Barcelona
 Mobile World Congress
Fashion in Barcelona
 Fashion in Barcelona
 The Brandery
Festivals in Barcelona
 Festival Grec de Barcelona
 La Mercè
Languages of Barcelona
 Spanish
 Catalan
Media in Barcelona
 Newspapers in Barcelona
La Vanguardia
El Periódico de Catalunya
 Radio and television in Barcelona
 Televisió de Catalunya
People from Barcelona
People from Barcelona
 Jose Barraquer
 Estanislao Figueras
 Joan Miró
 Romà Ribera

Religion in Barcelona 
Religion in Barcelona

Sports in Barcelona 

Sport in Barcelona
 Football in Barcelona
 Association football in Barcelona
 Football teams in Barcelona
FC Barcelona
RCD Espanyol
 Rugby football in Barcelona
 FC Barcelona Rugby
 Ice hockey in Barcelona
 FC Barcelona Ice Hockey
 Sports competitions in Barcelona
 1992 Summer Olympics
 Barcelona Marathon
 Barcelona Open
 Barcelona World Race
 Sports venues in Barcelona
 Camp Nou
 Circuit de Barcelona-Catalunya
 Estadi Olímpic Lluís Companys
 Nou Palau Blaugrana
 Palau Blaugrana
 Palau de Gel
 Palau dels Esports de Barcelona
 Palau Sant Jordi
 Piscina Municipal de Montjuïc
 Real Club de Polo de Barcelona
 Real Club de Tenis Barcelona
 Tennis de la Vall d'Hebron
 Velòdrom d'Horta

Economy and infrastructure of Barcelona 

Economy of Barcelona
 Business parks in Barcelona
 World Trade Center Barcelona
 Companies in Barcelona
Naturgy
 Financial services in Barcelona
 Bolsa de Valores de Barcelona
 CaixaBank
 Hotels and resorts in Barcelona
 Hilton Barcelona
 Hotel Arts
 Hotel Porta Fira
 Hotel Princesa Sofia 
 Renaissance Barcelona Fira Hotel
 W Barcelona
 Restaurants and cafés in Barcelona
 Restaurants in Barcelona
 Lasarte
 Els Quatre Gats
 Via Veneto  
 Shopping malls and markets in Barcelona
 La Boqueria
 Mercat del Born
 Arenas de Barcelona
 Tourism in Barcelona
 Tourist attractions in Barcelona
La Rambla

Transportation in Barcelona 

Transport in Barcelona
 Air transport in Barcelona
 Airports in Barcelona 
 Barcelona–El Prat Airport
 Cable transport in Barcelona
 Montjuïc Cable Car
 Port Vell Aerial Tramway
 Maritime transport in Barcelona
 Port of Barcelona
Port Vell
 Port Olímpic
 Road transport in Barcelona
 Buses in Barcelona
Barcelona Tourist Bus
 Cycling in Barcelona
 Bicing
 Roads in Barcelona
B-20 motorway

Rail transport in Barcelona 

Rail transport in Barcelona
  Barcelona Metro
 Lines

Stations
List of disused Barcelona Metro stations
 Funicular railway
 Montjuïc Funicular
 Tibidabo Funicular
 Vallvidrera Funicular
 Railway stations in Barcelona
 Barcelona França railway station
 Barcelona Sants railway station
 Trams in Barcelona
 Trambaix
 Trambesòs
 Tramvia Blau
 Tram stops in Barcelona

Education in Barcelona 

Education in Barcelona
 Libraries in Barcelona
 National Library of Catalonia
Barcelona Mass
 Universities and colleges in Barcelona
 Autonomous University of Barcelona
 Polytechnic University of Catalonia
 Pompeu Fabra University
 Ramon Llull University
 University of Barcelona
 Research institutes in Barcelona
 Barcelona Supercomputing Center
 Institute for Research in Biomedicine

Healthcare in Barcelona 

Healthcare in Barcelona
 Hospitals in Barcelona
 Hospital Sant Joan de Déu Barcelona
 Research centres in Barcelona
 Barcelona Biomedical Research Park

See also 

 Outline of geography

References

External links 

Barcelona
Barcelona
Barcelona